Tagus is a ghost town in Mountrail County, North Dakota, United States. The town was founded in 1900, approximately forty miles west of Minot and along the Great Northern Railway's transcontinental route. It incorporated in 1908 and reached a peak population of 140 in 1940. It was originally named Wallace, but was later renamed Tagus to avoid confusion with the town of Wallace, Idaho.

Tagus reported a population of just 14 during the 1970 Census, and the town disincorporated after the last business in town closed in 1976. The area is now part of Egan Township. In 2001, the sole remaining church was destroyed by fire, and local residents attribute the fire to vandalism. The spot is now marked by a memorial plaque. Tagus is now primarily abandoned, with a handful of residents and numerous vacant structures.

Climate
This climatic region is typified by large seasonal temperature differences, with warm to hot (and often humid) summers and cold (sometimes severely cold) winters.  According to the Köppen Climate Classification system, Tagus has a humid continental climate, abbreviated "Dfb" on climate maps.

References

Ghost towns in North Dakota
Populated places in Mountrail County, North Dakota
Former municipalities in North Dakota
Populated places established in 1908
1976 disestablishments in North Dakota
Populated places disestablished in 1976
1908 establishments in North Dakota